The Winter of '88 is a 1988 album by Johnny Winter. It was released by MCA Records. The album contains three compositions by Jerry Lynn Williams who also had several of his songs recorded by Eric Clapton.

Track listing 
"Close to Me" (Jerry Lynn Williams) 4:32
"Rain" (Dan Daley) 5:25
"Stranger Blues" (Clarence Lewis, Elmore James, Morris Levy) 4:05
"Ain't That Just Like a Woman" (Claude Demetrius, Fleecie Moore) 2:53
"World of Contradictions" (Johnny Winter) 4:16
"Lightning" (Bleu Jackson, Fred James) 5:40
"Looking for Trouble" (Tom Larsen) 3:55
"Show Me" (Williams) 4:41
"Anything for Your Love" (Williams) 4:03
"Look Away" (Terry Manning) 5:56
"Mother Earth"  (CD Bonus Track)
"It'll Be Me" (CD Bonus Track)

Personnel 
Johnny Winter - guitar, vocals
Terry Manning - keyboards, backing vocals
Lester Snell - keyboards
Ken Saydak - piano
Jon Paris - bass guitar, harmonica
Tom Compton - drums
William Brown - backing vocals

Production
Produced, Recorded & Mixed by Terry Manning
Mastered by Bob Ludwig

References

Johnny Winter albums
1988 albums
MCA Records albums